The 1985 ECAC Metro men's basketball tournament (now known as the Northeast Conference men's basketball tournament) was held March 2–4. All three rounds of the tournament were played at Reitz Arena in Baltimore, Maryland. 

Fairleigh Dickinson defeated  in the championship game, 63–59, to win the school's first ECAC Metro men's basketball tournament title. The Knights earned the automatic bid to the 1985 NCAA Tournament.

Bracket

References

Northeast Conference men's basketball tournament
Tournament
ECAC Metro men's basketball tournament
ECAC Metro men's basketball tournament